Francisco Cáffaro (born 19 May 2000) is an Argentine college basketball player for the Virginia Cavaliers of the Atlantic Coast Conference (ACC). 

Cáffaro represented the senior Argentina men's national basketball team at the 2020 Summer Olympics.

Early life
Cáffaro was born in San Jorge, Argentina, and grew up in Santa Fe, Argentina. From 2016–18, he attended the NBA Global Academy in Canberra, Australia and was one of the first graduates of the school to sign with an NCAA university.

Recruiting

College career
As a redshirt freshman, Cáffaro saw action in 20 games, averaging 1.4 points and 1.2 rebounds. He posted a career-high, 10 points and seven rebounds against UNC. As a redshirt sophomore, Cáffaro saw limited action in only 17 games, and posted collegiate career lows in games, minutes, and points due to the deep depth of the team.

International career
Cáffaro won the bronze medal at the 2018 FIBA Under-18 Americas Championship when he was named to the all-tournament team. He represented the senior Argentina national basketball team at the 2020 Summer Olympics men's tournament.

Career statistics

College

|-
| style="text-align:left;"| 2018–19
| style="text-align:left;"| Virginia
| style="text-align:center;" colspan="11"|  Redshirt
|-
| style="text-align:left;"| 2019–20
| style="text-align:left;"| Virginia
| 20 || 2 || 7.5 || .529 || – || .667 || 1.2 || .0 || .1 || .3 || 1.4
|-
| style="text-align:left;"| 2020–21
| style="text-align:left;"| Virginia
| 17 || 0 || 6.9 || .500 || – || .800 || 1.2 || .1 || .0 || .1 || 1.2
|- class="sortbottom"
| style="text-align:center;" colspan="2"| Career
| 37 || 2 || 7.2 || .517 || – || .720 || 1.2 || .1 || .1 || .2 || 1.3

References

External links
Virginia Cavaliers bio

2000 births
Living people
Argentine expatriate basketball people in the United States
Argentine men's basketball players
Basketball players at the 2020 Summer Olympics
Centers (basketball)
Olympic basketball players of Argentina
Sportspeople from Santa Fe, Argentina
Virginia Cavaliers men's basketball players